Edward Worth may refer to:
 Edward Worth (politician), Irish politician, physician and book collector
 Edward Worth (bishop), Church of Ireland bishop of Killaloe